Roberto Katsikas (born 5 August 1991) is a Greek professional footballer who plays as a central midfielder for St. Panteleimon.

Career
Born in Greece, Katsikas moved to England at a young age, joining Crystal Palace’s academy as a teenager. At the age of 18, Katsikas returned to Greece, signing for Ethnikos Asteras, remaining at the club for a year. A very impressive year at Paniliakos led Katsikas to sign for Greek heavyweights AEK Athens, becoming their first signing of the summer. In 2014, Katsikas signed for Mandraikos,before financial troubles at the club led to him returning to England a year later to sign for newly formed Greek diaspora club St. Panteleimon.

References

External links
 
 aek-live.gr

1991 births
Living people
Greek footballers
AEK Athens F.C. players
St. Panteleimon F.C. players
Gamma Ethniki players
Association football midfielders
Greek expatriate footballers
Greek expatriate sportspeople in England
Sportspeople from Corfu